Niyazova or Niazova (Niyozova) is a Russianised Central Asian (Kazakh, Uzbek, Bukhari Jewish, Tajiki, and Turkmen) family name.
 Muza Niyazova (b. 1938), First Lady of Turkmenistan
 Tahmina Niyazova (b. 1989), a Tajiki female singer

Kazakh-language surnames
Uzbek-language surnames
Tajik-language surnames
Jewish surnames
Turkmen-language surnames